Igor Lopatonok (born 1968 in the Ukrainian SSR, USSR) is a film producer, holding also US and Russian passports. He is known for his work in colorization and 3D conversion and as a documentary filmmaker.

He began to study engineering at the Dnipropetrovsk National University at age 16. Later he finished at Moscow State Institute of International Relations studies in International Finance and worked for a few years in this area. In 2005 he began his career as a producer in the film business, by co-founding the production company Technomedia which specialised in offering new digital technologies to Ukrainian film professionals. One example of work was the colorization of Only "Old Men" Are Going Into Battle, a Soviet war drama from the 1970s filmed in black and white. He was responsible for the 3D effects in The Nutcracker in 3D. With Oliver Stone as executive producer, he directed the controversial documentary Ukraine on Fire about the Maidan Uprising during the winter months of 2013/14. 

From 1992 until 2009 he was married to Marina Lopatonok. His second marriage (2009-2017) was with Nina Podolska.

In 2008 he moved to the Los Angeles area where he resides since.

Filmography 
 (as director) 
 Qazaq: History of the Golden Man (2021)
 The Everlasting Present - Ukraine: 30 Years of Independence (2021)
 Revealing Ukraine (2019)
 Ukraine on Fire (2016)

External links

References

Ukrainian film producers
1968 births
Living people